Myricks may refer to:

People
 Dary Myricks (b. 1976), American professional football player
 Larry Myricks (b. 1956), American athlete

Places
 Myricks, Massachusetts, an association community or populated place in Bristol County, Massachusetts, in the United States 
 Myricks Corner, California, an unincorporated community in Kern County, California, in the United States

Other
 Myricks Airport in Berkley, Massachusetts in the United States

See also
 Myrick (disambiguation)